The Cyclo-cross Boom is a cyclo-cross race in Boom, Belgium. Established in 2015, it is also called Niels Albert CX after two-time World Champion Niels Albert who retired early from the sport in 2014, aged 28 due to heart problems. Held in October, in the 2017-2018 season it became part of the Superprestige.

Winners

Male

Women

Notes

Cycle races in Belgium
Cyclo-cross races
Recurring sporting events established in 2015
2015 establishments in Belgium